William Youngson Rule Purvis (14 December 1938 – 30 July 2012) was an English professional footballer who played as a forward.

References

1938 births
2012 deaths
People from Berwick-upon-Tweed
English footballers
Association football forwards
Alnwick Town A.F.C. players
Berwick Rangers F.C. players
Grimsby Town F.C. players
Doncaster Rovers F.C. players
Skegness Town A.F.C. players
English Football League players
Footballers from Northumberland